Agetus is a genus of copepods belonging to the family Corycaeidae.

The genus has almost cosmopolitan distribution.

Species:

Agetus flaccus 
Agetus limbatus 
Agetus typicus

References

Copepods